Robert Sharples (2 July 19138 September 1987), known as Bob Sharples, was a British musical conductor, composer and bandleader, whose work encompassed films and well-known British television programmes in the 1960s and 1970s, most notably Opportunity Knocks (1964-1978).

Early life and pre-war big bands
Sharples was born in Bury, Lancashire, England, under the birth name Robert Standish. He began playing piano at the age of seven and organ at eleven. He studied orchestration, composition and conducting with Hamilton Harty in Manchester before moving to London to enter the world of jazz, where he played in nightclubs and began writing arrangement for big band leaders such as Ambrose, Jack Harris, Roy Fox and Carroll Gibbons. In 1934 he joined the Freddy Platt band at the Carlton Ballroom, Rochdale along with Geoff Love; Sharples played piano, and Love played trombone. He also played with Teddy Foster's big band, which was formed in 1945.

Decca
After the war and into the 1950s and 1960s Sharples became established as an independent arranger, conductor and musical director. Bob Sharples and His Music recorded many LPs for Decca Records, backing such artists as Jimmy Young, Lorrae Desmond, Tonia Bern, Kenneth McKellar and Sandie Shaw. Recordings for Decca under his own name included a series of themed arrangements, such as Dancing Round the World (1958), Waltz Magic (1958), America on the March (1964), and Battle Stereo (1964). He also worked with Lionel Bart, providing the orchestrations for the 1962 musical Blitz!. In 1963 he conducted the London Festival Orchestra (Decca's 'house orchestra') in a Phase 4 LP of music by Tchaikovsky, including the 1812 Overture and the Nutcracker suite.

Television variety
In the early 1960s Sharples became Musical Director for ABC Television based at Manchester's Didsbury Studios, where (with help from Ronnie Taylor and Johnny Roadhouse) he formed The ABC Television Orchestra. This was used to supply music for all the ABC shows of the period, including Big Night Out (1961-1965), Saturday Bandbox (1962) and the long-running talent show Opportunity Knocks (from 1964), whose host Hughie Green would routinely refer to Sharples as "Uncle Bob". When Opportunity Knocks was taken on by Thames TV in 1968, moving to the Teddington Studios, Sharples and his band were retained until the run finished in 1978. 

His best-known compositions are in the field of TV theme music and film music. Under the pseudonym Robert Earley (a musical joke, as he always arrived late for sessions) he wrote the themes for ABC's Public Eye and the later series of Special Branch, and under the pseudonym E. Ward composed the theme music for the 1969 ATV television series Fraud Squad. Sharples' other TV credits include themes for Thames Television, including Man At The Top (1970-72), The Rivals of Sherlock Holmes (1971), Harriet's Back in Town (1972), and Napoleon and Love (1974). He wrote music for the BBC documentary series The Explorers (1973-75), as well as incidental music to the Yorkshire Television children's series Follyfoot (1972-3) and Minder (1979) for Euston Films.

Other television variety show work with live music provided by Sharples included Hancock’s Half Hour (1956-60, with Wally Stott), Bruce Forsyth (1965-67),<ref>'[https://www.loc.gov/item/jots.200157796/ 'The Bruce Forsythe Show, Library of Congress]</ref> Tommy Cooper (1969) and Dave Allen at Large (1971).

Personal life
He married his wife Christina (1933-2013) in 1977 - although they had been together as a couple for the previous 12 years - and died in 1987 in St John's Wood, London, where he lived (once he moved South) very close to Lords Cricket Ground. His widow became the partner of Hughie Green for the last five years of his life, though she continued to live in the St John's Wood flat until her own death in 2013.

Selected filmography
 Where There's a Will (1955)
 Soho Incident (1956)
 The Strange World of Planet X (1958)
 Battle of the V-1 (1958)
 A Prize of Arms (1962)
 A Matter of Choice (1963)
 Futtocks End (1970)
 Find the Lady'' (1976)

References

External links
 
 Big Night Out, opening titles
 Theme to Public Eye

1913 births
1987 deaths
People from Bury, Greater Manchester
London Records artists
20th-century classical musicians
20th-century English composers